Bailey Sparks (born December 30, 2002) is an American professional soccer player who plays as a midfielder for Southern Methodist University.

Club career

Youth
Sparks made his professional debut for Sporting Kansas City II, the USL Championship affiliate of Sporting Kansas City, on September 30, 2020, against Indy Eleven. He came on as an 86th-minute substitute and scored in the game winner in the 5th minute of stoppage time as Sporting Kansas City II won 2–1.

College
In the fall of 2021, Sparks began playing college soccer at Southern Methodist University.

Career statistics

Club

References

External links 
Profile at SMU Mustangs
Profile at USL League Two

2002 births
Living people
American soccer players
Association football midfielders
Sporting Kansas City II players
USL Championship players
Soccer players from Dallas
SMU Mustangs men's soccer players
USL League Two players